The 1989 Boise State Broncos football team represented Boise State University in the 1989 NCAA Division I-AA football season. The Broncos competed in the Big Sky Conference and played their home games on campus at Bronco Stadium in Boise, Idaho. The Broncos were led by third–year head coach Skip Hall, Boise State finished the season 6–5 overall and 5–3 in conference.

Schedule

References

Boise State
Boise State Broncos football seasons
Boise State Broncos football